Cahokia may refer to;

Native American history
Cahokia, or Cahokia Mounds State Historic Site, a UNESCO World Heritage Site in Illinois, U.S.
Cahokia Woodhenge, an archeological site near Collinsville, Illinois
Cahokia people, a former Native American tribe that lived in Illinois

Communities & schools
Cahokia Heights, Illinois, a city in St. Clair County
Cahokia Unit School District 187 based in Cahokia Heights, Illinois
Cahokia High School in Cahokia Heights, Illinois
Cahokia, Illinois, a former village in St. Clair County
Cahokia Township, Macoupin County, Illinois

Other uses
Cahokia Conference, a high school athletic organization in southwestern Illinois
Cahokia Downs, a defunct horse racing track in St. Clair County, Illinois
Cahokia Vallis, a geological feature on the planet Mercury
Kaskaskia–Cahokia Trail, or Cahokia Trail, a road in Illinois, U.S.
USS Cahokia (ATA-186), a 1944 U.S. Navy tugboat

See also
Cohoke, Virginia
Kahoka, Missouri